Thomas Johansson defeated Yevgeny Kafelnikov in the final, 1–6, 6–3, 6–3 to win the men's singles tennis title at the 1999 Canadian Open.

Patrick Rafter was the defending champion, but was defeated in the quarterfinals by Nicolas Kiefer.

Seeds 
A champion seed is indicated in bold text while text in italics indicates the round in which that seed was eliminated.  The top eight seeds received a bye to the second round.

  Patrick Rafter (quarterfinals)
  Andre Agassi (semifinals)
  Yevgeny Kafelnikov (final)
  Tim Henman (second round)
  Richard Krajicek (second round)
  Todd Martin (quarterfinals)
 n/a
  Tommy Haas (third round)
  Nicolas Kiefer (semifinals)
  Thomas Enqvist (first round)
  Thomas Johansson (champion)
  Vincent Spadea (third round)
  Goran Ivanišević (first round)
 n/a
  Sébastien Grosjean (second round)
  Jonas Björkman (first round)
  Wayne Ferreira (third round)

Draw

Finals

Top half

Section 1

Section 2

Bottom half

Section 3

Section 4

External links 
 1999 du Maurier Open draw

Men's Singles